Visitors to Fiji must obtain a visa from one of the Fijian diplomatic missions unless they come from one of the 109 visa exempt countries. All visitors must hold a passport valid for 6 months.


Types Visas 
There are two types of visa one for a single visits or one for multiple. Single visit visas are for one visit within three months. Multiple visit visas are good for multiple visits over a period of twelve months. The paperwork required depends on the visit type and must be done prior to travel.

Visa policy map

Visa exempt countries 

Citizens of the following 110 countries and territories do not require a visa for Fiji for visits up to 4 months. They are issued with Visitor Permits on arrival for stays not exceeding 4 months, which may be extended on application for up to two months at a time for an aggregate of six months.

Visitor statistics
Most visitors arriving to Fiji were from the following countries of nationality:

See also

Visa requirements for Fijian citizens

References

Fiji
Foreign relations of Fiji